"A Test of Character" is an episode of the BBC sitcom Porridge. It aired on 18 March 1977. Godber is studying for his O Level History exam, but doesn't want Fletcher's method of cheating. Meanwhile, Fletcher and Warren are having a dispute on the Solar System.

Synopsis 
Godber is trying to study for his History O-Level, but Fletcher keeps talking. A heated argument between the two attracts the attention of Mr Mackay, who naturally demands to know what's going on. Mackay criticises Fletcher for being an ageing recidivist, while praising Godber for being willing to study. Mackay also makes it clear that Fletcher is not to disturb Godber. Soon after, Warren arrives and engages in a debate with Fletcher over the Solar System. Fed up with the constant interruptions, Godber storms out in a huff.

To help Godber, Fletcher accompanied by Warren and McClaren visit the study hall, where Mr. Barrowclough is helping violent inmate Spraggon with a creative writing course. Fletcher and McClaren distract Barrowclough with a demonstration of the Solar System, using different sizes of balls (and Barrowclough's apples) to represent the planets. At first, Spraggon refuses to betray Barrowclough, but relents when Warren offers him tobacco. Spraggon tells Warren where the keys are, allowing him to steal the exam paper.

Back at the cell, Godber appreciates the gesture, but turns them down as he feels he’s cheated most of his life, and wants to pass the exam honestly. Fletcher and Warren are annoyed at Godber because of the risk they took to help him. Fletcher points out to Godber that in the real world, there are very few breaks. For instance, a person with no convictions would always beat Godber in job interviews regardless of qualifications. Realising that Godber is not listening, Fletcher leaves him to it. Godber relents and has a look at the exam paper, much to Warren’s pleasure who is spying on him.

Next day, Godber has taken his exam and tells Fletcher and Warren that he is proud that he did it without cheating. At this, Fletcher tells Godber he doesn’t stand for hypocrisy and he knows about Warren seeing Godber looking at the exam paper. Godber asks who stole the exam paper, to which Warren says it was him. It turns out that due to Warren’s dyslexia, he took the biology paper instead of the history paper. The episode ends with a freeze frame of Fletcher grabbing Warren by the lapels.

Notes 
This episode may be a callback to the episode The Harder They Fall, where Fletcher tells Godber about the time where his son Raymond broke into the school to have a prior peep at his exam paper and still didn't pass. In this episode, Fletcher encourages Godber to have a peep at the exam paper prior to sitting his exam.

Porridge (1974 TV series) episodes
1977 British television episodes